The council of the Baviaans Local Municipality was elected in 2000, 2006 and 2011. The first two elections were conducted by a system of party-list proportional representation, while the 2011 election used mixed-member proportional representation. In 2016 the Baviaans Local Municipality was merged with two others to create the Dr Beyers Naudé Local Municipality; for election results in the merged municipality see Dr Beyers Naudé Local Municipality elections.

Results 
The following table shows the composition of the council after past elections.

2000 elections

The Baviaans Local Municipality was created in 2000, replacing the transitional local councils of Willowmore and Steytlerville. The council consisted of five members; the Democratic Alliance (DA) obtained a majority of three.

October 2002 floor crossing

In terms of the Eighth Amendment of the Constitution and the judgment of the Constitutional Court in United Democratic Movement v President of the Republic of South Africa and Others, in the period from 8–22 October 2002 councillors had the opportunity to cross the floor to a different political party without losing their seats. In the Baviaans council, two councillors crossed from the DA to the African National Congress (ANC), giving the ANC a majority of four.

2006 elections

The DA obtained a majority of three out of the five members.

2011 elections

At the time of this election the council was expanded to seven members, and the municipality was demarcated into four wards. Four councillors were elected by first-past-the-post voting from the wards, while the other three were appointed from party lists so that the total number of party representatives was proportional to the number of votes received. The DA obtained a majority of four members.

References

Municipal elections in South Africa
Elections in the Eastern Cape